Sean Keenan (born 18 January 1993) is an Australian actor, best known for his leading role in two seasons of the Australian children's television series, Lockie Leonard between 2007 and 2010, and then his role as Gary Hennessey on Puberty Blues until 2014.

In 2011, Keenan appeared in several television series, including Cloudstreet. He has a role in the 2013 film Drift. He has a twin sister, Lily. He grew up in the Western Australian town of Busselton and later relocated to Sydney.

Filmography

Theatre

Film

Television

References

External links

 
 Lockie Leonard
 Cloudstreet
Cosi

Living people
1993 births
Australian male film actors
Australian male television actors
21st-century Australian male actors
People from Busselton
Male actors from Sydney